The 2014–15 Columbus Blue Jackets season was the 15th season for the National Hockey League franchise that was established on June 25, 1997. The Blue Jackets missed the playoffs despite qualifying the previous year. The Blue Jackets finished strong, going 15-1-1 in their final 17 games.

Standings

Suspensions/fines

Schedule and results

Pre-season

Regular season

Player stats 
Final stats
Skaters

Goaltenders

†Denotes player spent time with another team before joining the Blue Jackets.  Stats reflect time with the Blue Jackets only.
‡Denotes player was traded mid-season.  Stats reflect time with the Blue Jackets only.
Bold/italics denotes franchise record.

Notable achievements

Awards

Milestones

Transactions 
The Blue Jackets have been involved in the following transactions during the 2014–15 season.

Trades

Free agents acquired

Free agents lost

Claimed via waivers

Lost via waivers

Player signings

Draft picks

The 2014 NHL Entry Draft was held on June 27–28, 2014 at the Wells Fargo Center in Philadelphia, Pennsylvania.

Draft notes

 The Detroit Red Wings' third-round pick went to the Columbus Blue Jackets as the result of a trade on June 28, 2014 that sent Edmonton's third-round pick in 2014 (63rd overall) to Detroit in exchange for a third-round pick in 2015 and this pick.
 The Columbus Blue Jackets' fifth-round pick was re-acquired as the result of a trade on June 25, 2014 that sent Nikita Nikitin to Edmonton in exchange for this pick.     Edmonton previously acquired this pick as the result of a trade March 5, 2014 that sent Nick Schultz to Columbus in exchange for this pick.
 The Columbus Blue Jackets' sixth-round pick went to the Minnesota Wild as the result of a trade on June 30, 2013 that sent Justin Falk to the New York Rangers in exchange for Benn Ferriero and this pick.     New York previously acquired this pick as the result of a trade on April 3, 2013 that sent Marian Gaborik, Blake Parlett and Steven Delisle to Columbus in exchange for Derick Brassard, Derek Dorsett, John Moore and this pick.

References

Columbus Blue Jackets seasons
Columbus
Columbus Blue Jackets season, 2014-15
National Hockey League All-Star Game hosts
Blue
Blue